Trichinella papuae is a nematode parasite responsible for a zoonotic disease called trichinellosis, predominantly in Thailand. Currently, eight species of Trichinella are known.

T. papuae is a nonencapsulated species, found in domestic and sylvatic swine of Papua New Guinea. This species differs by its larvae lacking a nurse cell in host muscle, and total length being one-third greater than T. pseudospiralis. Adults do not cross with adults from other species, and are unable to infect birds.

This species is known for surviving in carcasses of dead pigs.

References

Further reading 
Differentiation between species:

External links
EOL entry

Trichocephalida
Parasitic nematodes of mammals
Swine diseases
Nematodes described in 1999